Fotu La or Fatu La is a mountain pass on the Srinagar-Leh highway in the Zanskar Range of the Himalayas in India.

Fotu La is one of two high mountain passes between Leh and Kargil, the other being Namika La.

Moving eastwards, the highway begins to descend towards the Lamayuru after Fotu La. There is a Prasar Bharati television relay station serving Lamayuru located on the pass.

References

Mountain passes of Ladakh
Mountain passes of the Himalayas